The Essential Collection is a compilation album by British singer-songwriter Kirsty MacColl, released by Stiff Records in 1993. It contains seventeen tracks covering MacColl's early recording career for Stiff and includes those released as singles and B-sides, as well as selections from her debut album Desperate Character (1981). The last three tracks are included as bonus tracks.

Critical reception

Chris Woodstra of AllMusic described the compilation as a "fine collection", with "some of the best singles [MacColl] ever [wrote]". He added: "She wrote melodic pop singles that managed to recast the classic girl-group sound of the '60s into a style that was contemporary and timeless."

Track listing

References

Kirsty MacColl albums
1993 compilation albums